Torre De Babel may refer to:
 Torre De Babel (song)
 Torre de Babel (TV series)